Khar Road ([kʰaːɾ]; station code: KHAR) is a railway station on the Western Line and the Harbour Line of the Mumbai Suburban Railway network, in the Khar suburb. It is close to the Bandra Terminus for upcountry trains.

The name of the station is derived from the name of the Koli village Khar-Danda, near the Arabian Sea. Danda is a home to fishermen. Now a link will connect from Khar Danda to Bandra–Versova Sea Link.

On 11 July 2006, Khar Road was affected by the Mumbai train bombings.

References 

Railway stations in Mumbai Suburban district
Mumbai Suburban Railway stations
Mumbai WR railway division